Spane may refer to:

 Spain (surname), an English surname
 Robert J. Spane (born 1940), American vice admiral
 Spane, a character from the 1937 American film The Devil's Saddle Legion
 Sonia Spane, a character in the 1987 film series Watch the Shadows Dance
 Scale of Positive and Negative Experience, a scale for the assessment of wellbeing developed by Ed Diener